Wistron Corporation  is an electronics manufacturer based in Taiwan. It was the manufacturing arm of Acer Inc. before being spun off in 2000. As an original design manufacturer, the company designs and manufactures products for other companies to sell under their brand name.  Wistron products include notebook and desktop computers, servers, storage, LCD TVs, handheld devices, and devices and equipment for medical applications. 

Wistron employs over 80,000 people worldwide and has 12 manufacturing bases, 10 research and development centers, and 14 customer service centers.

History
The company originated from Acer Inc. and was formerly their manufacturing department.

spin-off from Acer in 2000 and became an independent company.

In 2009, joined the CDP Carbon Disclosure Project.

In July 2011, Wistron and Microsoft entered into an agreement that offered coverage under Microsoft's exclusive rights portfolio for Wistron products, including tablets, mobile phones, and other devices running the ChromeOS or Android platform.

In September 2011, Wistron signed a patent licensing agreement with Intellectual Ventures.

In 2020, the company set up a manufacturing plant in Vietnam. The 232,087.74 square meter lot is in the Dong Van III Industrial Zone in Ha Nam Province in northern Vietnam, Wistron said in a regulatory filing. The transaction would total 337.4 billion dong (US$14.6 million). 

On 17 July 2020, Wistron planned to sell its Kunshan plant to Mainland China's plant Luxshare for 3.3 billion renminbi yuan, and related operations are expected to be completed by the end of this year.

Controversy

India
In December 2020, 2000 workers coming off night shift rioted at a Wistron iPhone factory in Narasapura, India, causing damages estimated to $1 million. The workers claimed to have been underpaid in the previous months.

Wetland protection 
Via the Wistron Foundation and in cooperation with the Society of Wilderness NGO, Wistron contributes to conservation, revitalization and education for Shuanglianpi Wetland in Yilan County, Taiwan. The wetland is considered a "paradise" for aquatic plantlife and holds several nationally threatened species of flora. Indeed, the ratio of its botanic diversity to surface area is considered globally significant by the Forestry Bureau of Taiwan.

See also
 List of companies of Taiwan
Dixon Technologies
Foxconn

References

External links
 
Wistron Global Operations
Wistron expected to ship seven million notebooks in 3Q09

Computer hardware companies
Electronics companies of Taiwan
Manufacturing companies based in Taipei
Companies listed on the Taiwan Stock Exchange
Companies established in 2001
Multinational companies headquartered in Taiwan
Taiwanese brands